Melçan is a community in the Korçë County, Albania. At the 2015 local government reform it became part of the municipality Korçë.

History
During the 1920s, when the Bektashi Order and its headquarters in Hacıbektaş, Turkey were banned, the tekke of Melçan served as the first de facto headquarters of the Albanian Bektashi community until the World Headquarters of the Bektashi was officially set up in Tirana in 1930.

See also
Bajo Topulli

References

Populated places in Korçë
Villages in Korçë County